Keisung Academy is a co-educational independent day and boarding school for grades 10–12, located in Daegu, South Korea.

History

Origins
Keisung Academy was established in 1906 by missionary James E. Adams.

Campus facilities

Academic facilities
Henderson Hall was built in 1931 and is the symbol of Keisung Academy.
Adams Hall was used to print the Declaration of Independence of Korea in 1919 for the 3.1 movement in Daegu. The first western-style building in Young-Nam region(Gyeong-Sang State).
Mcpherson Hall was built as a Science building. but now it is being used as the Church of Keisung Academy
Adams Memorial Hall
Art building
Dong-san Hall
Shin Dong-san Hall

Athletic facilities
Shetuck Hall
2 fields
5 basketball courts
1 tennis court
1 fitness center

Relationship with Sinmyeong High School and Keimyung University
The name of Keimyung University is combination of 'Kei' of Keisung and 'myung' of Sinmyung.

Extra-curricular activities
There are 21 clubs.

Alumni
Park Mok-wol (graduated 1935), poet
Park Jeong-hui, judo practitioner

External links 
 http://www.keisung.hs.kr

High schools in Daegu
Private schools in South Korea
Jung District, Daegu
Educational institutions established in 1906
Christian schools in South Korea
1906 establishments in Korea